These lists of heads of state of Ireland compile monarchs and presidents of Ireland.

For Monarchs of Ireland, see Monarchy of Ireland#List of monarchs of Ireland
For Presidents of Ireland, see President of Ireland#List of presidents of Ireland
For Governors-General, see Governor-General of the Irish Free State#Governors-General of the Irish Free State (1922–36)